The scudetto (Italian for: "little shield") is a decoration having the colors of the flag of Italy which is sewn onto the jersey of the Italian sports clubs that won the highest level championship of their respective sport in the previous season. The scudetto was created in the 1920s to honour the winner of the national association football league (in 1929 rebranded as Serie A) and the first team to wear it was Genoa C.F.C. in 1924. Later, it was adopted by the teams of other sports.

The word scudetto is also used to indicate the Serie A trophy; "winning the scudetto" is a synonym of "winning Serie A".

Origin 

Sources generally agree that the inventor of the scudetto was the Italian poet and playwright Gabriele D'Annunzio. In his youth, D'Annunzio was a keen follower of football and in 1887 he bought in London a leather ball from the same manufacturer that supplied the Football League and would play football with his friends on the beach of his native Pescara.

In 1920, the former Austro-Hungarian city of Fiume (now the Croatian Rijeka) was annexed to Italy, D'Annunzio proposed that the local football team acknowledge supporting the Italian sovereignty over the city with a tricolored shield of green, white and red on their jerseys.

In 1924, the Italian Football Federation approved the decision to honour the defending champions allowing them to wear the scudetto on their jerseys. The Italian rugby union championship which started in 1928 became the second league which adopted the scudetto on a team's jersey to indicate a title holding team. Since then, the scudetto has become the symbol of the defending champions of every sports league in Italy.

Other countries including Portugal and Turkey also have their reigning champions wear a national symbol on their chests.

See also 
 Cockade of Italy
 Crest (sports)
 Star (football badge)

References 

National championships in Italy
Sport in Italy
Sports symbols
Sports terminology
Gabriele D'Annunzio
National symbols of Italy